Gertrude Vanderbilt Whitney (January 9, 1875 – April 18, 1942) was an American sculptor, art patron and collector, and founder in 1931 of the Whitney Museum of American Art in New York City. She was a prominent social figure and hostess, who was born into the wealthy Vanderbilt family and married into the Whitney family.

Early life

Gertrude Vanderbilt was born on January 9, 1875, in New York City, the second daughter of Cornelius Vanderbilt II (1843–1899) and Alice Claypoole Gwynne (1852–1934), and a great-granddaughter of "Commodore" Cornelius Vanderbilt. Her older sister died before Gertrude was born, but she grew up with several brothers and a younger sister. The family's New York City home was an opulent mansion at 742–748 Fifth Avenue., also known as 1 West 57th Street. As a young girl, Gertrude spent her summers in Newport, Rhode Island, at the family's summer home, The Breakers, where she kept up with the boys in all their rigorous sporting activities.  She was educated by private tutors and at the exclusive Brearley School for women students in New York City. She kept small drawings and watercolor paintings in her personal journals which were her first signs of being interested in the arts.

Education and early work

While visiting Europe in the early 1900s, Gertrude Whitney discovered the burgeoning art world of Montmartre and Montparnasse in France. What she saw encouraged her to pursue her creativity and become a sculptor.

She studied at the Art Students League of New York with Hendrik Christian Andersen and James Earle Fraser. Other women students in her classes included Anna Vaughn Hyatt and Malvina Hoffman. In Paris she studied with Andrew O'Connor and also received criticism from Auguste Rodin. Her training with sculptors of public monuments influenced her later direction. Although her catalogs include numerous smaller sculptures, she is best known today for her monumental works.

Her first public commission was Aspiration, a life-size male nude in plaster, which appeared outside the New York State Building at the Pan-American Exposition in Buffalo, New York, in 1901.
Initially she worked under an assumed name, fearing that she would be portrayed as a socialite and her work not taken seriously. Neither her family nor (after her marriage) her husband were supportive of her desire to work seriously as an artist. She once told an artist friend, "Never expect Harry to take your work seriously ... It never has made any difference to him that I feel as I do about art and it never will (except as a source of annoyance)." She believed that a man would have been taken more seriously as an artist, and that her wealth put her in a lose-lose situation: criticized if she took commissions because other artists were more needy, but blamed for undercutting the market for other artists if she was not paid.

In 1907, Whitney established an apartment and studio in Greenwich Village. She also set up a studio in Passy, a fashionable Parisian neighborhood in the XVI arrondissement.

By 1910 she was exhibiting her work publicly under her own name. Paganisme Immortel, a statue of a young girl sitting on a rock, with outstretched arms, next to a male figure, was shown at the 1910 National Academy of Design. Spanish Peasant was accepted at the Paris Salon in 1911, and Aztec Fountain was awarded a bronze medal in 1915 at the San Francisco Exhibition. Her first solo show occurred in New York City in 1916. The first charity exhibition she organized was in 1914 called the 50-50 Art Sale.

World War I and its aftermath

While at this hospital, Gertrude Whitney made drawings of the soldiers which became plans for her memorials in New York City. Her work prior to the war had a much less realistic style, which she strayed away from to give the work a more serious feeling. In 1915, her brother Alfred Gwynne Vanderbilt perished in the sinking of the RMS Lusitania.

She completed a series of smaller pieces realistically depicting soldiers in wartime, but her smaller works were not seen as particularly significant during her lifetime. Since her death critics have recognized the expert craftsmanship of her smaller works.

In addition to participating in shows with other artists, Whitney held a number of solo exhibitions during her career. These included a show of her wartime sculptures at her Eighth Street Studio in November 1919; a show at the Art Institute of Chicago, March 1 to April 15, 1923; and one in New York City, March 17–28, 1936. The majority of works created in this period of her work were made in her studio in Paris. The Whitney Museum of American Art held a commemorative show of her works in 1943.

Sculptures from her 1936 Show

Public sculptures
Following the end of the War, Whitney was also involved in the creation of a number of commemorative sculptures. During the 1920s her works received critical acclaim both in Europe and the United States, particularly her monumental works. During the 1930s the popularity of monumental pieces declined. Whitney's last pieces of public art were the Spirit of Flight, created for the New York World's Fair of 1939, and the Peter Stuyvesant Monument in New York City.

Gertrude Vanderbilt Whitney's numerous works in the United States include:
 Aztec Fountain – Pan American Union Building, Washington, D.C., 1912
 Fountain of El Dorado – 1915 Panama-Pacific Exposition, San Francisco, California
 Two reliefs on the Victory Arch – Madison Square, New York City, 1918–19
 Washington Heights-Inwood War Memorial – Mitchell Square Park, Washington Heights, New York City, erected 1922
 Buffalo Bill - The Scout, William F. Cody Memorial – Cody, Wyoming, dedicated 1924
 Untermyer Memorial, Woodlawn Cemetery, New York City, 1925  
 The Founders of the Daughters of the American Revolution, a memorial honoring the four founders – Constitution Hall, Washington, D.C., dedicated 1929; Gertrude was a member of the Daughters of the American Revolution.
 Titanic Memorial – Washington, D.C., unveiled 1931
 Peter Stuyvesant Monument, New York City, 1936–1939
 To the Morrow, vt. Wings, vt. Spirit of Flight, created for the World's Fair in New York, 1939

Whitney's Titanic Memorial is considered by critics as the most important achievement in her artistic career. The statue was built from a $50,000 prize from a competition that she won in 1914.

Whitney also created works which are now in other countries, including the A.E.F. Memorial in St. Nazaire Harbor in Saint-Nazaire, France (1924). The Government of France purchased a marble replica of the head of the Titanic Memorial, which is now housed in the Musée du Luxembourg.

Whitney sculpted the Christopher Columbus memorial, called "Monumento a la Fe Descubridora" (Monument to the Discovery Faith), in Huelva, Spain (1928–1933). With a cubist style, it is one of her biggest works.

In 1931 Whitney presented the Caryatid Fountain to McGill University in Montreal, Quebec, Canada. The fountain is also referred to as The Good Will Fountain, The Friendship Fountain, The Whitney Fountain,  The Three Graces and, because it consists of three nude males, The Three Bares. There is also a bronze version of this fountain in Washington Square in Lima, Peru.

Influence in art

Her great wealth afforded her the opportunity to become a patron of the arts, but she also devoted herself to the advancement of women in art, supporting and exhibiting in women-only shows and ensuring that women were included in mixed shows. She supported exhibition of artwork both locally and around the country, including the 1913 Armory Show in New York. Whitney also donated money to the Society of Independent Artists founded in 1917, which aimed to promote artists who deviated from academic norms. She actively bought works from new artists including the Ashcan School. In 1922, she financed publication of The Arts magazine, to prevent its closing. She was the primary financial backer for the "International Composer's Guild," an organization created to promote the performance of modern music.

By 1908, Whitney had opened the Whitney Studio Gallery in the same buildings as her own studio on West Eighth Street in Greenwich Village. Artists such as Robert Henri and Jo Davidson were invited to showcase their works there. In 1914, Gertrude Whitney also established the Whitney Studio Club at 147 West 4th Street, as an artists' club where young artists could meet and talk, as well as exhibit their works. She provided nearby housing many of them, as well as stipends for living costs at home and abroad. The Whitney Studio Club expanded again when its headquarters were moved back from West Fourth Street to West Eighth Street in 1923. Thus, the club expanded both in size and scope of programming. These early galleries would evolve to become Whitney's greatest legacy, the Whitney Museum of American Art, on the site of what is now the New York Studio School of Drawing, Painting and Sculpture.

In 1929, Whitney offered the New York Metropolitan Museum of Art the donation of her twenty-five-year collection of nearly 700 American modern art works and full payment for building a wing to accommodate these works. Her offer was declined because the museum would not take American art, and in 1931, Whitney decided to create her own museum by renovating and expanding on one of her own studios. Whitney appointed Juliana Force, who was formerly her assistant since 1914, to be the museum's first director. The museum aimed to embrace modernism, shifting away from the notions that American art was largely rural and narrow in scope.

A colorful recollection of one of her parties celebrating her artist friends was recounted by the artist Jerome Myers:

Matching it in memory is a party at Mrs. Gertrude Vanderbilt Whitney's, on her Long Island estate, the artists there a veritable catalog of celebrities, painters and sculptors. I can hardly visualize, let alone describe, the many shifting scenes of our entertainment: sunken pools and gorgeous white peacocks as line decorations spreading into the gardens; in their swinging cages, brilliant macaws nodding their beaks at George Luks as though they remembered posing for his pictures of them; Robert Chanler showing us his exotic sea pictures, blue-green visions in a marine bathroom; and Mrs. Whitney displaying her studio, the only place on earth in which she could find solitude. Here the artists felt at home, the Whitney hospitality always gracious and sincere.

Her Greenwich Village studio has been named a National Treasure by the National Trust for Historic Preservation, giving it landmark status.

When Whitney died in 1942, the Whitney Museum of American Art was cleared of the debt it owed her and granted $2.5 million of her money.

Personal life
Gertrude had a dear friend named Esther in her youth with whom a number of love letters were uncovered which made explicit the desires both had for a physical relationship that surpassed friendship.  Esther was the daughter of Richard Morris Hunt, the architect who had built Gertrude's family home in New York City and summer home—The Breakers—in Newport, Rhode Island, as well as many of the other Vanderbilts' mansions.  Gertrude considered it one of the "thrills of my life, when Esther kissed me," and her mother, Alice, was so concerned about the friendship that she forbade Gertrude to see Esther. The separation seemed to have worked; for while Esther continued to write heartbroken letters of longing, Gertrude went on to have a bevy of male beaux.  

At age 21, on August 25, 1896, she married the extremely wealthy sportsman Harry Payne Whitney (1872–1930). A banker and investor, Whitney was the son of politician William Collins Whitney and Flora Payne, the daughter of former U.S. Senator from Ohio Henry B. Payne, and sister to a Standard Oil Company magnate. Harry Whitney inherited a fortune in oil and tobacco as well as interests in banking. In New York, the couple lived in town houses originally belonging to William Whitney, first at 2 East 57th St., across the street from Gertrude's parents, and after William Whitney's death, at 871 Fifth Avenue. They also had a country estate in Old Westbury, Long Island. Gertrude and Harry Whitney had three children:
Flora Payne Whitney (1897–1986)
Cornelius Vanderbilt Whitney (1899–1992)
Barbara Whitney (1903–1983;  1960, to George W. Headley).

Harry Whitney died of pneumonia in 1930, at age 58, leaving his widow an estate valued at $72 million. In 1934, she was at the center of a highly publicized court battle with her brother Reginald's widow, Gloria Morgan Vanderbilt, for custody of her ten-year-old niece, Gloria Vanderbilt. Gertrude Vanderbilt Whitney did win custody of her niece at the end of the custody battle.

Gertrude Whitney died on April 18, 1942, at age 67, and was interred next to her husband in Woodlawn Cemetery in The Bronx, New York City. The reported cause of her death was from a heart condition. Her daughter Flora Whitney Miller assumed her mother's duties as head of the Whitney Museum, and was succeeded by her daughter, Flora Miller Biddle.

Awards and honors
 Medal of Award at Panama-Pacific Exhibition for Fountain of El Dorado, 1915
 Associate member of National Sculpture Society, 1916
 Medal from the New York Society of Architects for the Mitchel Square World War I memorial, 1923
 Honorary degree, New York University, 1922
 Honorary degree, Tufts University, 1924
 Bronze medallion at Paris Salon for Buffalo Bill – The Scout, 1924
French Legion of Honor medal, 1926
 Honorary degree, Rutgers University, 1934
 Elected an honorary member of the American Institute of Architects, 1934
 Honorary degree, Russell Sage College, 1940
 Associate of National Academy of Design, 1940
 Medal of Honor of the National Sculpture Society, 1940

In popular culture
In the 1982 television miniseries Little Gloria... Happy at Last, Whitney was portrayed by actress Angela Lansbury, who earned an Emmy nomination for her performance.

In 1999, Gertrude Whitney's granddaughter, Flora Miller Biddle, published a family memoir entitled  The Whitney Women and the Museum They Made. She was also the subject of B. H. Friedman's 1978 Gertrude Vanderbilt Whitney: A Biography.

References

External links

 
 

20th-century American sculptors
20th-century American women artists
1875 births
1942 deaths
American art collectors
American art patrons
American people of Dutch descent
American people of English descent
American people of Welsh descent
American socialites
American women in World War I
American women sculptors
Art Students League of New York alumni
Artists from New York City
Burials at Woodlawn Cemetery (Bronx, New York)
People associated with the Whitney Museum of American Art
People from Greenwich Village
Philanthropists from New York (state)
Sculptors from New York (state)
Gertrude Vanderbilt Whitney
Gertrude Vanderbilt Whitney
Museum founders
Women founders